This is a list of things named after Ziaur Rahman, the 7th President of Bangladesh (1977–1981). This list includes proposed name changes.

Buildings
 Zia Memorial Museum in Chittagong
 Muktijoddha Ziaur Rahman Hall in University of Dhaka
 Shaheed Ziaur Rahman Hall in University of Rajshahi
 Shahid Ziaur Rahman Hall in Islamic University, Bangladesh
 Shahid President Ziaur Rahman Hall in Rajshahi University of Engineering and Technology
 Zia Hall in Khulna

Educational institutions
 Shaheed Ziaur Rahman Medical College in Bogra
 Shahid Ziaur Rahman College in Dinajpur District
 Shahid Ziaur  Rahaman Degree College in Barisal District
 Shahid President Ziaur Rahman College in Dhaka District
 K. C. Shaheed Ziaur Rahman Degree College in Chittagong District
 Shahid Ziaur Rahman Degree College in Jamalpur District

Streets
 Ziaur Rahman Way in Chicago
 Bir Uttam Ziaur Rahman Road in Dhaka

Topographical features
 Shahid Zia Shishu Park in Dhaka
 Zia Park in Chittagong District
Shahid Zia Shishu Park in Rajshahi

See also
List of things named after Sheikh Mujibur Rahman
List of things named after Sheikh Hasina

References 

Ziaur Rahman
Rahman, Ziaur